Sir Edwin Wilberforce Carrington,  is the former Secretary-General of the Caribbean Community (CARICOM), serving from 1992 to 2010.

Academic career
Born in Parlatuvier in Tobago, Carrington attended the University College of the West Indies and McGill University, Montreal, Quebec, Canada, earning a BA degree in economics. He subsequently earned a MA degree in economics from the University of the West Indies. He briefly served as a Junior Research Fellow at the Institute of Social and Economic Research (ISER), University of the West Indies (UWI).

Diplomatic career
Carrington joined the CARIFTA Secretariat, as CARICOM was then called, advancing to the position of Director of the Trade and Integration Division.  In 1975, Carrington served as the CARICOM representative during negotiations for the Lomé Convention.  From 1985 to 1990, Carrington served as Secretary-General of the African, Caribbean and Pacific Group of States (ACP), previously serving as Deputy Secretary-General from 1977. He became the Secretary-General of the Caribbean Community in August 1992 serving until December 2010.  This tenure marks him as the longest serving Secretary-General of the Caribbean Community. Carrington is a member of Washington D.C. based think tank the Inter-American Dialogue. He currently serves as the Ambassador of Trinidad and Tobago to the Caribbean Community.

Awards
 Knight Commander of the Order of the Nation (KCN) (Antigua and Barbuda)
 Trinity Cross (TC)
 Chaconia Medal (CM)
 Companion of Honour of Barbados (CHB)
 Member of the Order of the Caribbean Community (OCC)
 Grand Cross with Silver Breast Star of the Order of Merit of Duarte, Sánchez and Mella
 The Cacique's Crown of Honour (CCH)
 Honorary Member of the Order of Jamaica (OJ Hon.)
 Grand Cordon of the Honorary Order of the Yellow Star
 Commander of the Order of Civil Merit (Spain)
 Commander of the Order of Merit of the Italian Republic
 Pelican Award, UWIAA Distinguished Alumni Awards (Trinidad and Tobago)

References

External links 

 Caribbean Community

People from Tobago
Alumni of University of London Worldwide
Alumni of the University of London
University of the West Indies alumni
McGill University alumni
Trinidad and Tobago diplomats
Living people
Members of the Order of Jamaica
Order of Civil Merit members
Commanders of the Order of Merit of the Italian Republic
Recipients of the Order of the Nation (Antigua and Barbuda)
Grand Crosses with Silver Breast Star of the Order of Merit of Duarte, Sánchez and Mella
Grand Cordons of the Honorary Order of the Yellow Star
Recipients of the Trinity Cross
Recipients of the Chaconia Medal
Caribbean Community people
Year of birth missing (living people)
Members of the Inter-American Dialogue
Recipients of the Order of the Caribbean Community